This is a list of notable performances of third party and independent candidates in United States mayoral elections. It is rare for candidates, other than those of the six parties which have succeeded as major parties (Federalist Party, Democratic-Republican Party, National Republican Party, Democratic Party, Whig Party, Republican Party), to take large shares of the vote in elections.

Listed below are mayoral elections in which a third party or independent candidate won or were reasonably close to receiving 5.0% of the vote (greater than 4.95%). Winners are shown in bold. All elections are organized by state. These lists do not however include non-partisan elections, where the political affiliations of the candidates are not shown on the ballot, leaving no real major or minor party candidates.

Arizona

California

Connecticut

Delaware

District of Columbia

Indiana

Illinois

Iowa

Louisiana

Maryland

Massachusetts

Minnesota

Mississippi

New Jersey

New York

Ohio

Pennsylvania

Rhode Island

South Carolina

Vermont

Virginia

Wisconsin

References 

Lists of elections in the United States
Third party (United States)